Maulana Noorullah is a Pakistani politician who is member-elect of the Provincial Assembly of the Balochistan.

References

Living people
Muttahida Majlis-e-Amal MPAs (Balochistan)
Politicians from Balochistan, Pakistan
Year of birth missing (living people)